Dosolo is a comune (municipality) in the Province of Mantua in the Italian region Lombardy, located about  southeast of Milan and about  southwest of Mantua.

The municipality of Dosolo contains the frazioni (subdivisions, mainly villages and hamlets) Correggioverde and Villastrada.

Dosolo borders the following municipalities: Gualtieri, Guastalla, Luzzara, Pomponesco, Suzzara, Viadana.

Demographic evolution

References

Cities and towns in Lombardy